Darren Stanton, from Nottingham, England, is an English hypnotist, psychologist, body language expert, television broadcaster and published author. Stanton has appeared on many television programmes including This Morning and The One Show whilst also discussing psychology related breaking-news stories on BBC Radio and commercial radio programmes. Stanton also lectures locally in the UK on body language, lie detection and neuro-linguistic programming.

Career 
Stanton began his career in the police force working firstly for Nottinghamshire Constabulary as a Special Constable, and then later Derbyshire Constabulary as a regular response police officer. Having always had a strong connection and interest in neuro-linguistic programming, hypnotism, body language and psychology, he began to pursue a media career in 2009.

In 2011, Stanton was asked by several of the major media including outlets such as MSN News, The Scotsman and The Independent to assess the truthfulness and body language of Rupert and James Murdoch and Rebekah Brooks during the News International phone hacking scandal.

His reports were circulated in the major media and were picked up as far afield as Australia and Japan, launching him into a new career being dubbed by the media as "the human lie detector".

Stanton assessed all the party leadersb in the United Kingdom general election debates in 2015 and the candidates running for presidency in the United States presidential election in 2016.b
2018, Darren joined reporter Jennie Bond where he assessed the wedding of Prince Harry and Meghan Markle.

Publishing career 
Stanton has published one book to date. Project Jam Jar is a psychological self-help success book. It aims to empower its audience by introducing them to tried and tested techniques that allow readers to make changes that last a lifetime.
 Project Jam Jar  Print On Demand Worldwide 2011

References

External links 
 Official website
How to: Know if your date is lying
10 Ways To Tell If Your Partner Is Cheating On You, The Huffington Post UK

British writers
Living people
Year of birth missing (living people)